Chirai River (aka Sakara River) is a river in Gujarat in western India, whose origin is above the ancient city of Khirsara. Its basin has a maximum length of 30 km. The total catchment area of the basin is 365 km2.

The Tapar Dam (Tappar Dam) on the Chirai was completed in 1975.  It was an earthen embankment dam with a concrete cover, 4,575 meters long and 17.75 meters high. It was designed to hold 48.81 million cubic meters of water. The dam failed as a result of the January 2001 Bhuj earthquake, and was subsequently rebuilt. The Tapar Reservoir (Tapar Reservoir) provides water for the Gandhidham metropolitan area and the port at Kandla.

References

Rivers of Gujarat
Rivers of India